The Suncoast Conference (SCC), hosted by the National Junior College Athletic Association (NJCAA), is one of four conferences within Region 8 of the NJCAA.  It is composed of four state colleges within the state of Florida, and is administered by the Florida State College Activities Association (FCSAA).  Conference championships are held in most sports and individuals can be named to All-Conference and All-Academic teams.

Members

Current members
Hillsborough Community College 
Florida SouthWestern State College
Polk State College 
St. Petersburg College 
State College of Florida, Manatee–Sarasota
South Florida State College

Former members
Florida College
Pasco–Hernando State College

See also
National Junior College Athletic Association (NJCAA)
Florida State College Activities Association (FCSAA - the governing body of NJCAA Region 8)
Mid-Florida Conference, also in Region 8
Panhandle Conference, also in Region 8
Southern Conference, also in Region 8

External links
FSCAA/NJCAA Region 8 website
NJCAA Website

NJCAA conferences
College sports in Florida